Spiros Hadjidjanos (born 1978 in Athens, Greece) is a contemporary artist living in Berlin. His work includes sculpture, photography and digital media.

Education 
Hadjidjanos has studied at the Athens School of Fine Arts (2002–07), Leiden University (2004-06) and the UdK Berlin (2008–10). He has been awarded with the UdK Meisterschülerpreis des Präsidenten, DAAD postgraduate award and Fulbright Scholarship.

Work 
His work has been exhibited in several venues including KW Institute for Contemporary Art, Berlin (2016), Musée d'Art Moderne de la Ville de Paris (2016), Palais de Tokyo, Paris (2017), Städel Museum, Frankfurt (2017), Foam, Amsterdam (2018) and ZKM Center for Art and Media, Karlsruhe (2019).

In 2016, Hadjidjanos collaborated with Bill Kouligas in an audio-visual piece produced to be presented at the Volksbühne in Berlin in the context of Decession. The artwork included a light installation responding to wireless router communication signals.

References

External links 

 Artist's website
 Spiros Hadjidjanos network time. Ghent: Art Paper Editions. 2014. . .
 Kramer, Markus, 1973-. Photographic objects : Thomas Ruff, Wade Guyton, Seth Price, Kelley Walker, Spiros Hadjidjanos. Cohen, Mitch, 1952-. Heidelberg. . .

21st-century German photographers
21st-century German sculptors
21st-century German male artists
German male sculptors
German digital artists
1978 births
Living people
21st-century Greek artists
Photographers from Berlin
Artists from Athens